Qualifications for Women's artistic gymnastic competitions at the 2010 Summer Youth Olympics was held at the Bishan Sports Hall on August 17. The results of the qualification determined the qualifiers to the finals: 18 gymnasts in the all-around final, and 8 gymnasts in each of 4 apparatus finals.

The competition was divided to 4 sessions, at 10:00am, 1:30pm, 5:00pm and 8:00pm.

Qualification results

Results

Results

Gymnastics at the 2010 Summer Youth Olympics
Women's sports competitions in Singapore
2010 in women's gymnastics